Miroslav (1305–06) was a Serbian nobleman with the title of kaznac, serving King Stefan Milutin (r. 1282–1321). He was among the witnesses mentioned in the charter issued to the Ratac Monastery by Milutin in 1306, alongside noblemen čelnik Branko and župan Vladislav, holding the title of kaznac. Miroslav held the surroundings of Vranje, while tepčija Kuzma held the župa of Vranje.

References

Sources
 

14th-century Serbian nobility
People of the Kingdom of Serbia (medieval)
13th-century births
14th-century deaths
Kaznac
Vranje